The 2015–16 Panathinaikos season was the club's 57th consecutive season in the Super League Greece. They will also compete in the Greek Cup. Qualifying rounds will determine whether the club will compete in the UEFA Champions League or the UEFA Europa League.

Players

Transfers

In

Total spending:  €2,050,000

Promoted from youth system

Out

Total income:  €3,000,000

Expenditure:   €950,000

Pre-season and friendlies

Competitions

Super League Greece

Regular season

League table

Matches

Play-offs

League table

Matches

Greek Cup

Group D

Round of 16

Quarter-finals

UEFA Champions League

Qualifying phase

Third qualifying round

UEFA Europa League

Play-off round

Squad statistics

Appearances and goals

|-
|colspan="14"|Players away on loan:

|-
|colspan="14"|Players who left Panathinaikos during the season:

|}

Goal scorers

Disciplinary record

References

External links
 Panathinaikos FC official website

Panathinaikos
Panathinaikos F.C. seasons